Ermete Novelli (5 March 185130 January 1919) was an Italian actor and playwright.

Born in Lucca, the son of a prompter, Novelli made his first appearance in 1866, and played character and leading comedy parts in the best companies between 1871 and 1884. By 1885 he had his own company, and made a great success in Paris in 1898 and 1902.

He established in Rome in 1900 a new theatre, the Casa di Goldoni, on the lines of the Comédie-Française. He dramatized Émile Gaboriau's Monsieur Lecoq, and alone or in collaboration wrote several comedies and many monologues; his tragedy La Masque, written in collaboration with Bonaspetti, was produced in 1911. He appeared in a number of early silent films.

He died in Naples in 1919, aged 67, survived by at least one child, his son, Enrico "Yambo" Novelli.

Selected filmography
 King Lear (1910)

References

External links
 

1851 births
1919 deaths
Writers from Lucca
19th-century Italian dramatists and playwrights
Italian male stage actors
Italian male film actors
Italian male silent film actors
20th-century Italian male actors
19th-century Italian male actors
Italian male dramatists and playwrights